Amidu Karim (born 10 October 1974) is a retired Sierra Leonean football striker. He was a squad member for the 1994 and 1996 African Cup of Nations.

References

1997 births
Living people
Sierra Leonean footballers
Sierra Leone international footballers
Mighty Blackpool players
Gomhoriat Shebin SC players
Association football forwards
Sierra Leonean expatriate footballers
Expatriate footballers in Egypt
Sierra Leonean expatriate sportspeople in Egypt